Kattagaram (North) is a village in the Udayarpalayam taluk of Ariyalur district, Tamil Nadu, India.

Demographics 

As per the 2001 census, Kattagaram (North) had a total population of 2957 with 1480 males and 1477 females.

References 

Villages in Ariyalur district